The Meissel–Mertens constant (named after Ernst Meissel and Franz Mertens), also referred to as Mertens constant, Kronecker's constant, Hadamard–de la Vallée-Poussin constant or the prime reciprocal constant, is a mathematical constant in number theory, defined as the limiting difference between the harmonic series summed only over the primes and the natural logarithm of the natural logarithm:

Here γ is the Euler–Mascheroni constant, which has an analogous definition involving a sum over all integers (not just the primes).

The value of M is approximately
M ≈ 0.2614972128476427837554268386086958590516... .

Mertens' second theorem establishes that the limit exists.

The fact that there are two logarithms (log of a log) in the limit for the Meissel–Mertens constant may be thought of as a consequence of the combination of the prime number theorem and the limit of the Euler–Mascheroni constant.

In popular culture

The Meissel-Mertens constant was used by Google when bidding in the Nortel patent auction. Google posted three bids based on mathematical numbers: $1,902,160,540 (Brun's constant), $2,614,972,128 (Meissel–Mertens constant), and $3.14159 billion (π).

See also
 Divergence of the sum of the reciprocals of the primes
 Prime zeta function

References

External links
 
 On the remainder in a series of Mertens (postscript file)

Mathematical constants